Loxostege peltalis is a species of moth in the family Crambidae. It is found in Russia.

References

Moths described in 1842
Pyraustinae